The Adventures of Fridolin is an East German film. It was released in 1948.

External links
 

1948 films
1948 comedy films
German comedy films
East German films
1940s German-language films
Films directed by Wolfgang Staudte
German black-and-white films
1940s German films